Dzhambulat Bizhamov is a Russian boxer. He participated at the 2021 AIBA World Boxing Championships, being awarded the silver medal in the middleweight event. Bizhamov was also winner of the European Championships.

References

External links 

Living people
Year of birth missing (living people)
Place of birth missing (living people)
Russian male boxers
Middleweight boxers
AIBA World Boxing Championships medalists
Youth and Junior World Boxing Championships medalists